Strada statale 72 di San Marino (SS 72) is a motorway that connects the province of Rimini and connects the provincial capital with the Republic of San Marino. The current road, built after the World War II, is 10,600 km long and has a typically flat layout. It consists of two lanes in each direction of travel and replaces the old state road 72. The road begins on the outskirts of Rimini and ends at the Dogana state border. In San Marino, it continues as the San Marino Highway.

History
Strada statale 72 was established in 1928 with the following route: "Rimini - San Marino border."

References 

72
Transport in Emilia-Romagna
Transport in San Marino